TuS Bar Kochba, is a German association football club based in Nürnberg, Bavaria established in 1913 as a social-sport club for the Jewish community in Nürnberg.

The club only fields a side in the senior A-league of the Bavarian Football Association, a competition made up of older players.

History
TuS Bar Kochba was founded in 1913 as the "Jewish Gymnastics and Sports Club Nuremberg". It was named after Simon bar Kokhba, a Jewish rebel. In 1939, the Nazi authorities dissolved the association. It is no longer exclusively Jewish.

A Berlin chapter, the Bar Kochba Berlin, was also formed.

See also
Football in Germany
List of football clubs in Germany

References

External links
Official Site
Bar Kochba Blätter, digitized editions of the organization's newsletter 1927-1929, at the Leo Baeck Institute, New York

Association football clubs established in 1913
Jewish football clubs
Football clubs in Germany
Football clubs in Bavaria
Jewish organisations based in Germany
Bar Kochba
Football in Middle Franconia
Sports clubs banned by the Nazis
1913 establishments in Germany